Laetare Sunday () is the fourth Sunday in the season of Lent, in the Western Christian liturgical calendar. Traditionally, this Sunday has been a day of celebration within the austere period of Lent. This Sunday gets its name from the first few words of the traditional Latin entrance verse (Introit) for the Mass of the day.  ("Rejoice, O Jerusalem") is Latin from Isaiah 66:10.

History
The term "Laetare Sunday" is used by most Roman Catholic, Lutheran, and Anglican churches. The Latin  is an imperative: "rejoice!"

The full Introit reads:
 Psalm: 
Rejoice ye with Jerusalem; and be ye glad for her, all ye that delight in her: exult and sing for joy with her, all ye that in sadness mourn for her; that ye may suck, and be satisfied with the breasts of her consolations. Psalm: I was glad when they said unto me, We will go into the house of the Lord.

Alternative names
This Sunday is currently also known as Mothering Sunday, Refreshment Sunday, mid-Lent Sunday (in French ) and Rose Sunday (either because the golden rose sent by Popes to Catholic sovereigns used to be blessed at this time, or because the use of rose-colored rather than violet vestments was permitted on this day).

Historically, the day was also known as "the Sunday of the Five Loaves," from the story of the miracle of the loaves and fishes. Before the adoption of the modern "common lectionaries", this narrative was the traditional Gospel reading for this Sunday in Roman Catholic, Lutheran, Anglican, and Old Catholic churches.

The station church at Rome for this day was Santa Croce in Gerusalemme, one of the seven chief basilicas; the Golden Rose, sent by Popes to Catholic sovereigns, used to be blessed at this time and for this reason the day was sometimes called Dominica de Rosa.

Customs

On Mothering Sunday, Christians have historically visited their mother church—the church in which they received the sacrament of baptism.

In  Roman Catholic, Anglican, Lutheran and Old Catholic churches flowers may appear on the high altar and the organ may be played as a solo instrument. Priests are given the option to wear rose-colored vestments at Mass held on this day in place of the violet vestments normally worn during Lent. The term "rose" is used to describe this lighter shade of the color violet in the Roman Rite.

The Sunday is considered a day of relaxation from normal Lenten rigours: a day of hope with Easter at last within sight. Traditionally, weddings (otherwise banned during Lent) could be performed on this day, and servants were released from service for the day to visit their mother church, the place in which they received the sacrament of baptism (hence 'Mothering Sunday').

Laetare Sunday is the date on which the recipient of University of Notre Dame's  Laetare Medal is announced.

Date
Laetare Sunday is exactly 21 days before Easter Sunday, a moveable feast based on the cycles of the moon. The earliest occurrence of Laetare Sunday in the twenty-first century was on 2 March 2008, and the latest will be on 4 April 2038.

Laetare Sunday occurs on these dates:

2019 – 31 March
2020 – 22 March
2021 – 14 March
2022 – 27 March
2023 – 19 March
2024 – 10 March
2025 – 30 March
2026 – 15 March
2027 – 7 March
2028 – 26 March
2029 – 11 March
2030 – 31 March
2031 – 23 March
2032 – 7 March
2033 – 27 March
2034 – 19 March
2035 – 4 March
2036 – 23 March
2037 – 15 March
2038 – 
2039 – 20 March
2040 – 11 March
2041 – 31 March
2042 – 16 March
2043 – 8 March
2044 – 27 March
2045 – 19 March
2046 – 4 March
2047 – 24 March
2048 – 15 March
2049 – 28 March
2050 – 20 March
2051 – 12 March
2052 – 31 March
2053 – 16 March
2054 – 8 March
2055 – 28 March
2056 – 12 March
2057 – 
2058 – 24 March
2059 – 9 March
2060 – 28 March
2061 – 20 March
2062 – 5 March
2063 – 25 March
2064 – 16 March
2065 – 8 March
2066 – 21 March
2067 – 13 March
2068 – 
2069 – 24 March
2070 – 9 March
2071 – 29 March
2072 – 20 March
2073 – 5 March
2074 – 25 March
2075 – 17 March
2076 – 29 March
2077 – 21 March
2078 – 13 March
2079 – 
2080 – 17 March
2081 – 9 March
2082 – 29 March
2083 – 14 March
2084 – 5 March
2085 – 25 March
2086 – 10 March
2087 – 30 March
2088 – 21 March
2089 – 13 March
2090 – 26 March
2091 – 18 March
2092 – 9 March
2093 – 22 March
2094 – 14 March
2095 – 
2096 – 25 March
2097 – 10 March
2098 – 30 March
2099 – 22 March
2100 – 7 March

See also

 Gaudete Sunday

References

 Catholic Encyclopedia: "Laetare Sunday"

Lent
Christian Sunday observances
March observances